Victor J. Westerberg (February 6, 1912 – March 1985) is a former Republican member of the Pennsylvania House of Representatives.

References

Republican Party members of the Pennsylvania House of Representatives
1912 births
1985 deaths
20th-century American politicians